The Quadreria della Fondazione Cassa di Risparmio di Fano (Gallery of the Foundation of Fano Saving Bank) houses a notable collection of Italian paintings from the 1600-1900s, collected over the last forty years by Cassa di Risparmio di Fano (which now transferred to the holding entity – the Fondazione). It is located in the Salone del Consiglio of the financial institution, formerly the Case dei Malatesti, in the city of Fano, Marche.

The painting gallery is open to the public by pre-arranged guided tour. The collection contains the following paintings from before the 19th century:

Collection

Quadreria

Pinacoteca San Domenico
Many of the sacred works and former altarpieces are since 2013 on display in the restored but deconsecrated church of San Domenico.

References

Sources
Homepage

Art museums and galleries in Marche
Museums in Fano